Brnik may refer to:
 Brnik, Poland, a village in Poland
 , a village in Republic of Macedonia

 or:
 Zgornji Brnik, a village in Slovenia
 Spodnji Brnik, a village in Slovenia

or:
 Ljubljana Airport, an airport in Slovenia